The brush nudibranch, Tritonia sp. 2, as designated by Gosliner, 1987, is a species of dendronotid nudibranch. It is a marine gastropod mollusc in the family Tritoniidae. As at November 2009, it remained undescribed by science.

Distribution

This species has only been found off South Africa, from the Atlantic coast of the Cape Peninsula to Jeffreys Bay, intertidally to 40 m. It appears to be endemic.

Description

The brush nudibranch reaches 50 mm in size. Its body is apricot-coloured with clusters of white spots on its notum.  Its short rhinophores extend from cup-like sheaths. It has short paired branching projections down the length of its body. Short branching tentacles extend from the front of its head.

Ecology

The brush nudibranch probably feeds on soft corals. Its egg mass is opaque, white and highly convoluted.

References

Tritoniidae
Undescribed gastropod species